The Provost of Fife is the ceremonial head of Fife Council, a Scottish unitary authority covering the historic county of Fife. Along with the duties of an ordinary councillor, it is the Provost's duty to promote the values of the council, provide an example to others and enhance the reputation of the council and Fife.

The Provost is elected every five years by the members of the Council. The title was reinstated in May 2004. The current Provost is Councillor Jim Leishman.

References

External links
 Fife Council

Politics of Fife
Fife